Luke Felsch (born 5 April 1974) is a former professional Australian rugby league footballer.

Career
Felsch came to St. George Dragons via Woodlawn College, in Lismore, New South Wales where he played in the Commonwealth Bank Cup. Felsch played for the St. George Dragons for five seasons between 1994 and 1998, including the Australian Rugby League grand final loss to Manly Warringah Sea Eagles in 1996.

Felsch played in St. George's final game before they formed a joint venture with the Illawarra Steelers to become St. George Illawarra.  A semi-final loss to Canterbury-Bankstown at Kogarah Oval.

He then moved to Gateshead Thunder in 1999 and Hull F.C. in 2000-2001 before joining St. George Illawarra in 2002 before retiring.

References

1974 births
Living people
Australian rugby league players
Gateshead Thunder (1999) players
Hull F.C. players
Rugby league players from New South Wales
Rugby league locks
St. George Illawarra Dragons players
St. George Dragons players